The Great Turkish War, also called the Wars of the Holy League, was a series of conflicts between the Ottoman Empire and the Holy League consisting of the Holy Roman Empire, Poland-Lithuania, Venice, Russia, and Habsburg Hungary. Intensive fighting began in 1683 and ended with the signing of the Treaty of Karlowitz in 1699. The war was a defeat for the Ottoman Empire, which for the first time lost large amounts of territory, in Hungary and the Polish–Lithuanian Commonwealth, as well as part of the western Balkans. The war was significant also by being the first time that Russia was involved in an alliance with Western Europe.

The French did not join the Holy League, as France had agreed to reviving an informal Franco-Ottoman alliance in 1673, in exchange for Louis XIV being recognized as a protector of Catholics in the Ottoman regime.
 
Initially, Louis XIV took advantage of the start of the war to extend France's eastern borders in the War of the Reunions, taking Luxembourg and Strasbourg in the Truce of Ratisbon. However, as the Holy League made gains against the Ottoman Empire, capturing Belgrade by 1688, the French began to worry that their Habsburg rivals would grow too powerful and eventually turn on France. The Glorious Revolution was also a matter of concern for the French, as William III of Orange-Nassau was being invited by English nobles in the Invitation to William letter to take control of England as king. Therefore, the French besieged Philippsburg on 27 September 1688, breaking the truce and triggering the separate Nine Years' War, which relieved the Turks.

As a result, the advance made by the Holy League stalled, allowing the Ottomans to retake Belgrade in 1690. The war then fell into a stalemate, and peace was concluded in 1699 which began following the Battle of Zenta in 1697 when an Ottoman attempt to retake their lost possessions in Hungary was crushed by the Holy League.

The war largely overlapped with the Nine Years' War (1688–1697), which took up the vast majority of the Habsburgs' attention while it was active. In 1695, for instance, the Holy Roman Empire states had 280,000 troops in the field, with England, the Dutch Republic, and Spain contributing another 156,000 specifically to the conflict against France. Of those 280,000, only 74,000, or about one quarter, were positioned against the Turks; the rest were fighting France. Overall, from 1683 to 1699, the Imperial States had on average 88,100 men fighting the Turks, while from 1688 to 1697, they had on average 127,410 fighting the French.

Background (1667–1683)

Following Bohdan Khmelnytsky's rebellion, the Tsardom of Russia in 1654 acquired territories from the Polish–Lithuanian Commonwealth (currently parts of Eastern Ukraine), while some Cossacks stayed in the southeastern part of the Commonwealth. Their leader, Petro Doroshenko, sought the Ottoman Empire′s protection and in 1667 attacked Polish commander John Sobieski.

Sultan Mehmed IV, who knew that the Polish–Lithuanian Commonwealth was weakened by internal conflicts, in August 1672 attacked Kamenets Podolski, a large city on the border of the Commonwealth. The small Polish force resisted the siege of Kamenets for two weeks but was then forced to surrender. The Polish army was too small to resist the Ottoman invasion and could score only some minor tactical victories. After three months, the Poles were forced to sign the Treaty of Buchach in which they agreed to cede Kamenets, Podolia and to pay a tribute to the Ottomans. When the news of the defeat and treaty terms reached Warsaw, the Sejm refused to pay the tribute and organized a large army under Sobieski; subsequently, the Poles won the Battle of Khotyn (1673). After the death of King Michael in 1673, Sobieski was elected king of Poland. He tried to defeat the Ottomans for four years, with no success. The war ended on 17 October 1676 with the Treaty of Żurawno in which the Turks retained control over only Kamianets-Podilskyi. This Turkish attack also led in 1676 to the beginning of the Russo-Turkish Wars.

Overview
After a few years of peace, the Ottoman Empire, encouraged by successes in the west of the Polish–Lithuanian Commonwealth, attacked the Habsburg monarchy. The Turks almost captured Vienna, but John III Sobieski led a Christian alliance that defeated them in the Battle of Vienna (1683), stalling the Ottoman Empire's hegemony in south-eastern Europe.

A new Holy League was initiated by Pope Innocent XI and encompassed the Holy Roman Empire (headed by Habsburg Austria), the Polish–Lithuanian Commonwealth and the Venetian Republic in 1684, joined by Russia in 1686. The second Battle of Mohács (1687) was a crushing defeat for the Sultan. The Turks were more successful on the Polish front and were able to retain Podolia during their battles with the Polish–Lithuanian Commonwealth.

Russia's involvement marked the first time the country formally joined an alliance of European powers. This was the beginning of a series of Russo-Turkish Wars, the last of which was World War I. As a result of the Crimean campaigns and Azov campaigns, Russia captured the key Ottoman fortress of Azov.

Following the decisive Battle of Zenta in 1697 and lesser skirmishes (such as the Battle of Podhajce in 1698), the League won the war in 1699 and forced the Ottoman Empire to sign the Treaty of Karlowitz. The Ottomans ceded most of Hungary, Transylvania and Slavonia, as well as parts of Croatia, to the Habsburg monarchy while Podolia returned to Poland. Most of Dalmatia passed to Venice, along with the Morea (the Peloponnese peninsula), which the Ottomans reconquered in 1715 and regained in the Treaty of Passarowitz of 1718.

Serbia 

After allied Christian forces had captured Buda from the Ottoman Empire in 1686 during the Great Turkish War, Serbs from Pannonian Plain (present-day Hungary, Slavonia region in present-day Croatia, Bačka and Banat regions in present-day Serbia) joined the troops of the Habsburg monarchy as separate units known as Serbian Militia. Serbs, as volunteers, massively joined the Habsburg side. In the first half of 1688, the Habsburg army, together with units of Serbian Militia, captured Gyula, Lippa (today Lipova, Romania) and Borosjenő (today Ienu, Romania) from the Ottoman Empire. After the capture of Belgrade from the Ottomans in 1688, Serbs from the territories in the south of Sava and Danube rivers began to join Serbian Militia units.

Kosovo 
Kosovo Albanian Roman Catholic Bishop and philosopher Pjetër Bogdani returned to the Balkans in March 1686 and spent the next years promoting resistance to the armies of the Ottoman Empire, in particular in his native Kosovo. He and his vicar Toma Raspasani played a leading role in the pro-Austrian movement in Kosovo during the Great Turkish War. He contributed a force of 6,000 Albanian soldiers to the Austrian army which had arrived in Pristina and accompanied it to capture Prizren. There, however, he and much of his army were met by another equally formidable adversary, the plague. Bogdani returned to Pristina but succumbed to the disease there in 6 December 1689. His nephew, Gjergj Bogdani, reported in 1698 that his uncle's remains were later exhumed by Turkish and Tatar soldiers and fed to the dogs in the middle of the square in Pristina.

Among the papers of Ludwig von Baden in Karlsruhe, there is a copy of an intercepted letter, in French, written by a secretary of the English embassy in Istanbul on 19 January 1690.  It reported that the "Germans" in Kosovo had made contact with 20,000 Albanians who had turned their weapons against the Turks.

Associated wars

Morean War

Venice had held several islands in the Aegean and the Ionian seas, together with strategically positioned forts along the coast of the Greek mainland since the carving up of the Byzantine Empire after the Fourth Crusade. However, with the rise of the Ottomans, during the 16th and early 17th centuries, they lost most of these, such as Cyprus and Euboea (Negropont) to the Turks. Between 1645 and 1669, the Venetians and the Ottomans fought a long and costly war over the last major Venetian possession in the Aegean, Crete. During this war, the Venetian commander, Francesco Morosini, came into contact with the rebellious Maniots, for a joint campaign in the Morea. In 1659, Morosini landed in the Morea, and together with the Maniots, he took Kalamata. However, he was soon after forced to return to Crete, and the Peloponnesian venture failed. 

In 1683, a new war broke out between the Habsburg monarchy and the Ottomans, with a large Ottoman army advancing towards Vienna. In response to this, a Holy League was formed. After the Ottoman army was defeated in the Battle of Vienna, the Venetians decided to use the opportunity of the weakening of Ottoman power and its distraction in the Danubian front so as to reconquer its lost territories in the Aegean and Dalmatia. On 25 April 1684, the Most Serene Republic declared war on the Ottomans.

Aware that she would have to rely on her own strength for success, Venice prepared for the war by securing financial and military aid in men and ships from the Knights of Malta, the Duchy of Savoy, the Papal States, and the Knights of St. Stephen. In addition, the Venetians enrolled large numbers of mercenaries from Italy and the German states, especially Saxony and Brunswick.

Operations in the Ionian Sea 
In mid-June, the Venetian fleet moved from the Adriatic towards the Ottoman-held Ionian Islands. The first target was the island of Lefkada (Santa Maura), which fell, after a brief siege of 16 days, on 6 August 1684. The Venetians, aided by Greek irregulars, then crossed into the mainland and started raiding the opposite shore of Acarnania. Most of the area was soon under Venetian control, and the fall of the forts of Preveza and Vonitsa in late September removed the last Ottoman bastions. These early successes were important for the Venetians not only for reasons of morale, but because they secured their communications with Venice, denied to the Ottomans the possibility of threatening the Ionian Islands or of ferrying troops via western Greece to the Peloponnese, and because these successes encouraged the Greeks to cooperate with them against the Ottomans.

The conquest of the Morea 
Having secured his rear during the previous year, Morosini set his sights upon the Peloponnese, where the Greeks, especially the Maniots, had begun showing signs of revolt and communicated with Morosini, promising to rise up in his aid.  Ismail Pasha, the new military commander of Morea, learned of this and invaded the Mani Peninsula with 10,000 men, reinforcing the three forts that the Ottomans already garrisoned, and compelled the Maniots to give up hostages to secure their loyalty. As a result, the Maniots remained uncommitted when, on 25 June 1685, the Venetian army, 8,100 men strong, landed outside the former Venetian fort of Koroni and laid siege to it. The castle surrendered after 49 days, on 11 August, and the garrison was massacred. After this success, Morosini embarked his troops towards the town of Kalamata, in order to encourage the Maniots to revolt. The Venetian army, reinforced by 3,300 Saxons and under the command of general , defeated a Turkish force of ca. 10,000 outside Kalamata on 14 September, and by the end of the month, all of Mani and much of Messenia were under Venetian control.

In October 1685, the Venetian army retreated to the Ionian Islands for winter quarters, where a plague broke out, something which would occur regularly in the next years, and take a great toll on the Venetian army, especially among the German contingents. In April 1686, the Venetians helped repulse an Ottoman attack that threatened to overrun Mani, and were reinforced from the Papal States and Tuscany. The Swedish marshal Otto Wilhelm Königsmarck was appointed head of the land forces, while Morosini retained command of the fleet. On 3 June Königsmarck took Pylos and proceeded to lay siege the fortress of Navarino. A relief force under Ismail Pasha was defeated on June 16, and the next day the fort surrendered. The garrison and the Muslim population were transported to Tripoli. Methoni (Modon) followed on 7 July, after an effective bombardment destroyed the fort's walls, and its inhabitants were also transferred to Tripoli. The Venetians then advanced towards Argos and Nafplion, which was then the most important town in the Peloponnese. The Venetian army, ca. 12,000 strong, landed around Nafplion between 30 July and August 4. Königsmarck immediately led an assault upon the hill of Palamidi, then unfortified, which overlooked the town. Despite the Venetians' success in capturing Palamidi, the arrival of a 7,000 strong Ottoman army under Ismail Pasha at Argos rendered their position difficult. The Venetians' initial assault against the relief army succeeded in taking Argos and forcing the pasha to retreat to Corinth, but for two weeks, from 16 August, Königsmarck's forces were forced to continuously repulse attacks from Ismail Pasha's forces, fight off the sorties of the besieged Ottoman garrison and cope with a new outbreak of plague. On 29 August 1686 Ismail Pasha attacked the Venetian camp, but was heavily defeated. With the defeat of the relief army, Nafplion was forced to surrender on September 3. News of this major victory were greeted in Venice with joy and celebration. Nafplion became the Venetians' major base, while Ismail Pasha withdrew to Achaea after strengthening the garrisons at Corinth, which controlled the passage to Central Greece.

Despite losses to the plague during the autumn and winter of 1686, Morosini's forces were replenished by the arrival of new German mercenary corps from Hannover in spring 1687. Thus strengthened, he was able to move against the last major Ottoman bastion in the Peloponnese, the town of Patras and the fort of Rion, which along with its twin at Antirrion controlled the entrance to the Corinthian Gulf (the "Little Dardanelles"). On 22 July 1687, Morosini, with a force of 14,000, landed outside Patras, where the new Ottoman commander, Mehmed Pasha, had established himself. Mehmed, with an army of roughly equal size, attacked the Venetian force immediately after it landed, but was defeated and forced to retreat. At this point panic spread among the Ottoman forces, and the Venetians were able, within a few days, to capture the citadel of Patras, and the forts of Rion, Antirrion, and Nafpaktos (Lepanto) without any opposition, as their garrisons abandoned them. This new success caused great joy in Venice, and honours were heaped on Morosini and his officers. Morosini received the victory title "Peloponnesiacus", and a bronze bust of his was displayed in the Great Hall, something never before done for a living citizen. The Venetians followed up this success with the reduction of the last Ottoman bastions in the Peloponnese, including Corinth, which was occupied on 7 August, and Mystra, which surrendered later in the month. The Peloponnese was under complete Venetian control, and only the fort of Monemvasia (Malvasia) in the southeast continued to resist, holding out until 1690.

Polish–Ottoman War (1683–1699)

After a few years of peace, the Ottoman Empire attacked the Habsburg monarchy again. The Turks almost captured the Empire's capital of Vienna, but king of Poland John III Sobieski led a Christian alliance that defeated them in the Battle of Vienna, which shook the Ottoman Empire's hegemony in south-eastern Europe.

A new Holy League was initiated by Pope Innocent XI and encompassed the Holy Roman Empire (headed by Habsburg Austria), joined by the Venetian Republic and Poland in 1684 and the Tsardom of Russia in 1686. The Ottomans suffered two decisive defeats against the Holy Roman Empire: the second Battle of Mohács in 1687 and the Battle of Zenta a decade later, in 1697.

On the smaller Polish front, after the battles of 1683 (Vienna and Parkany), Sobieski, after his proposal for the League to start a major coordinated offensive, undertook a rather unsuccessful offensive in Moldavia in 1686, with the Ottomans refusing a major engagement and harassing the army. For the next four years Poland would blockade the key fortress at Kamenets, and Ottoman Tatars would raid the borderlands. In 1691, Sobieski undertook another expedition to Moldavia, with slightly better results, but still with no decisive victories.

The last battle of the campaign was the Battle of Podhajce in 1698, where Polish hetman Feliks Kazimierz Potocki defeated the Ottoman incursion into the Commonwealth. The League won the war in 1699 and forced the Ottoman Empire to sign the Treaty of Karlowitz. The Ottomans thereby lost much of their European possessions, with Podolia (including Kamenets) returned to Poland.

Russo-Turkish War (1686–1700)

During the war, the Russian army organized the Crimean campaigns of 1687 and 1689, which both ended in Russian defeats. Despite these setbacks, Russia launched the Azov campaigns in 1695 and 1696, and after raising the siege in 1695 successfully occupied Azov in 1696.

Battle of Vienna 

Capturing the city of Vienna had long been a strategic aspiration of the Ottoman Empire, because of its interlocking control over Danubian (Black Sea to Western Europe) southern Europe, and the overland (Eastern Mediterranean to Germany) trade routes. During the years preceding this second siege (the first had taken place in 1529), under the auspices of grand viziers from the influential Köprülü family, the Ottoman Empire undertook extensive logistical preparations, including the repair and establishment of roads and bridges leading into the Holy Roman Empire and its logistical centres, as well as the forwarding of ammunition, cannon and other resources from all over the Ottoman Empire to these centres and into the Balkans. Since 1679, the plague had been raging in Vienna.

The main Ottoman army finally laid siege to Vienna on 14 July 1683. On the same day, Kara Mustafa sent the traditional demand for surrender to the city. Ernst Rüdiger Graf von Starhemberg, leader of the remaining 15,000 troops and 8,700 volunteers with 370 cannon, refused to capitulate. Only days before, he had received news of the mass slaughter at Perchtoldsdorf, a town south of Vienna, where the citizens had handed over the keys of the city after having been given a similar choice. Siege operations started on 17 July.

On 6 September, the Poles under John III Sobieski crossed the Danube 30 km north-west of Vienna at Tulln to unite with the Imperial troops and the additional forces from Saxony, Bavaria, Baden, Franconia, and Swabia. Louis XIV of France declined to help his Habsburg rival, having just annexed Alsace. An alliance between Sobieski and the Emperor Leopold I resulted in the addition of the Polish hussars to the already existing allied army. The command of the forces of European allies was entrusted to the Polish king, who had under his command 70,000–80,000 soldiers facing a Turkish army of 150,000. Sobieski's courage and remarkable aptitude for command were already known in Europe.

During early September, the experienced 5,000 Ottoman sappers had repeatedly blown up large portions of the walls between the Burg bastion, the Löbel bastion and the Burg ravelin, creating gaps of about 12m in width. The Viennese tried to counter this by digging their own tunnels to intercept the depositing of large amounts of gunpowder in caverns. The Ottomans finally managed to occupy the Burg ravelin and the low wall in that area on 8 September. Anticipating a breach in the city walls, the remaining Viennese prepared to fight in the inner city.

Staging the battle 

The relief army had to act quickly to save the city and so prevent another long siege. Despite the binational composition of the army and the short space of only six days, an effective leadership structure was established, centred on the King of Poland and his heavy cavalry (Polish Hussars). The Holy League settled the issues of payment by using all available funds from the government, loans from several wealthy bankers and noblemen and large sums of money from the Pope. Also, the Habsburgs and Poles agreed that the Polish government would pay for its own troops while still in Poland, but that they would be paid by the Emperor once they had crossed into Imperial territory. However, the Emperor had to recognise Sobieski's claim to first rights of plunder of the enemy camp in the event of a victory.

Kara Mustafa Pasha was less effective at ensuring his forces' motivation and loyalty, and preparing for the expected relief-army attack. He had entrusted defence of the rear to the Khan of Crimea and his cavalry force, which numbered about 30–40,000. There is doubt as to how far the Tatars participated in the final battle before Vienna.
The Ottomans could not rely on their Wallachian and Moldavian allies. George Ducas, Prince of Moldavia, was captured, while Șerban Cantacuzino's forces joined the retreat after Sobieski's cavalry charge.

The confederated troops signalled their arrival on the Kahlenberg above Vienna with bonfires. Before the battle a Mass was celebrated for the King of Poland and his nobles.

Battle 

At around 6:00 pm, the Polish king ordered the cavalry to attack in four groups, three Polish and one from the Holy Roman Empire. Eighteen thousand horsemen charged down the hills, the largest cavalry charge in history. Sobieski led the charge at the head of 3,000 Polish heavy lancers, the famed "Winged Hussars". The Lipka Tatars who fought on the Polish side wore a sprig of straw in their helmets to distinguish themselves from the Tatars fighting on the Ottoman side. The charge easily broke the lines of the Ottomans, who were exhausted and demoralised and soon started to flee the battlefield. The cavalry headed straight for the Ottoman camps and Kara Mustafa's headquarters, while the remaining Viennese garrison sallied out of its defences to join in the assault.

The Ottoman troops were tired and dispirited following the failure of both the attempt at sapping and the assault on the city and the advance of the Holy League infantry on the Turkenschanz. The cavalry charge was one last deadly blow. Less than three hours after the cavalry attack, the Christian forces had won the battle and saved Vienna. The first Christian officer who entered Vienna was Margrave Ludwig of Baden, at the head of his dragoons.

Afterwards Sobieski paraphrased Julius Caesar's famous quotation (Veni, vidi, vici) by saying "Veni, vidi, Deus vicit" – "I came, I saw, God conquered".

Conclusion 

On September 11, 1697, the Battle of Zenta was fought just south of the Ottoman ruled city of Zenta. During the battle, Habsburg Imperial forces routed the Ottoman forces while the Ottomans were crossing the Tisa River (which is near the city). This resulted in the Habsburg forces killing over 30,000 Ottomans and dispersing the rest. This crippling defeat was the ultimate factor of the Ottoman Empire signing the Treaty of Karlowitz on January 22, 1699, ending the Great Turkish War. This treaty resulted in the transfer of most of Ottoman Hungary to the Habsburgs, and prompted the Ottomans to adopt a more defensive military policy in the following century.

See also
 Enea Silvio Piccolomini, among the first Christian victims of the war. 
 Croatian-Slavonian-Dalmatian theater in Great Turkish War
 Scutum Sobiescianum

References

Sources

 
 
 Setton, Kenneth Meyer.  Venice, Austria, and the Turks in the Seventeenth Century (Memoirs of the American Philosophical Society, 1991) excerpt
 Wolf, John B. The Emergence of the Great Powers: 1685–1715 (1951), pp 15–53.
 

 
History of the Ottoman Empire in Europe
History of Central Europe
History of Eastern Europe
Wars involving the Ottoman Empire
Wars involving Austria
Wars involving Lithuania
Wars involving the Republic of Venice
Wars involving Moldavia
Wars involving Poland
Wars involving Wallachia
1680s conflicts
1690s conflicts
Ottoman period in Moldova
Ottoman period in Ukraine
Ottoman Serbia
Military operations involving the Crimean Khanate
1680s in the Habsburg monarchy
1690s in the Habsburg monarchy
17th century in Austria
1680s in the Ottoman Empire
1690s in the Ottoman Empire
17th century in the Habsburg monarchy
17th century in the Polish–Lithuanian Commonwealth
17th-century conflicts
Wars involving Montenegro
Habsburg monarchy–Ottoman Empire relations
France–Ottoman Empire relations